Svetlana Nikolayevna Tolstaya-Akimzhanova (born 9 August 1971) is a Kazakhstani race walker. She was born in Almaty, Kazakhstan.

Achievements

External links
 
sports-reference

1971 births
Living people
Sportspeople from Almaty
Kazakhstani female racewalkers
Athletes (track and field) at the 1996 Summer Olympics
Athletes (track and field) at the 2000 Summer Olympics
Athletes (track and field) at the 2004 Summer Olympics
Athletes (track and field) at the 2008 Summer Olympics
Olympic athletes of Kazakhstan
Asian Games medalists in athletics (track and field)
Athletes (track and field) at the 1998 Asian Games
Athletes (track and field) at the 2002 Asian Games
Athletes (track and field) at the 2006 Asian Games
Asian Games bronze medalists for Kazakhstan
Medalists at the 1998 Asian Games
Medalists at the 2002 Asian Games
Svetlana
Kazakhstani people of Russian descent